The qualification round of  Men's 25 metre rapid fire pistol event was held on 12 and 13 April 2018 at the Belmont Shooting Centre, while the final was held on 13 April 2018 at the same place. Anish Bhanwala from India won the gold medal while Sergei Evglevski from Australia won the silver medal.

Results

Qualification

Finals

Key
Q = Qualified for Finals
GR = Games record
SO = Athlete eliminated by Shoot-off for tie

References

External links
Schedule

Shooting at the 2018 Commonwealth Games